Roberto Carlo Mendoza (born May 15, 1956) is a Puerto Rican sport shooter. He competed at the 2000 Summer Olympics in the men's skeet event, in which he tied for 32nd place.

References

1956 births
Living people
Skeet shooters
Puerto Rican male sport shooters
Shooters at the 2000 Summer Olympics
Olympic shooters of Puerto Rico